Anna Maria Krasnowolska (born 1949) is a Polish Iranologist.

Works
 Aleksander Chodzko (1804-1891) and his "oriental" poems
 Az in dar va az ān dar
 Historia Iranu
 In the Orient where the gracious light... : satura orientalis in honorem Andrzej Pisowicz
 International conference on Kurdish studies, 17–19 May 2004
 Iranica cracoviensia : Cracov Iranian Studies in memory of Władysław Dulęba
 Irańskie drogi do nowoczesności : projekty, idee, manifesty
 Języki orientalne w przekładzie.
 Kit—ab al-Ins—an al-K—amil
 Księga o człowieku doskonałym : (wybór traktatów)
 Mediaeval and modern Iranian studies : proceedings of the 6th European Conference of Iranian Studies, held in Vienna on 18–22 September 2007 by the Societas Iranologica Europaea
 Międzynarodowa konferencja Kurdystan-Język, literatura i historia, 17-19 maja 2004.
 Mythes, croyances populaires et symbolique animale dans la littérature persane
 Notes on the Afghan invasion of the frontier of Iran from the year 1134 to the year 1137
 Oriental languages in translation conference organized by Institute of Oriental philology, Jagellonian University and the Oriental committee of the Polish academy of sciences, Cracow branch, May 20-21st 2002
 prophet Xezr-Eliās in Iranian popular beliefs, The : with some Slavic parallels

References

Polish orientalists
1949 births
Iranologists
Farabi International Award recipients
Living people